"Les Vacances d'été ("The Summer Vacations") " is a song by the Belgian Eurodance singer Kim Kay. It was released in 2000 on EMI as the second single and as well as the fifth track from her only compilation album, Hits! (2000). It is a Eurodance song that was originally written by traditional "O Mal Hão" and its French adaptation written by Véronique Loiselet and produced by Phil Sterman and Lov Cook.

Track listing

Charts

References

External links
 
 
 

2000 singles
Year of song unknown
Kim Kay songs
EMI Records singles
French-language songs
Holiday songs
Songwriter unknown